For the senior hurling equivalent see: Leinster Senior Club Hurling Championship

The Leinster Junior Club Hurling Championship (known for sponsorship reasons as the AIB Leinster GAA Hurling Junior Club Championship) is an annual hurling competition organised by the Leinster Council of the Gaelic Athletic Association and contested by the various champion clubs from the province of Leinster in Europe. It is the most prestigious competition for junior clubs in Leinster hurling.

The Leinster Junior Club Championship was introduced in 2000. In its current format, the championship begins in late October and is usually played over a six-week period. The participating club teams compete in a straight knockout competition that culminates with the Leinster final for the two remaining teams. The winner of the Leinster Junior Championship qualifies for the subsequent All-Ireland Club Championship.

Kilkenny clubs have accumulated the highest number of victories with 16 wins. Wexford side Horeswood are the reigning champions, having beaten Commercials from Dublin by 1-18 to 3-11 in the 2022 final.

Teams

Qualification

List of Finals

Roll of Honour

Special Junior Hurling Championship

References

 
 3